The sixth season of The Real Housewives of New Jersey, an American reality television series, premiered on July 13, 2014, and is broadcast on Bravo. It is primarily filmed in North Jersey and Central Jersey; its executive producers are Rebecca Toth Diefenbach, Valerie Haselton, Lucilla D'Agostino, Jim Fraenkel, Omid Kahangi, Caroline Self, and Andy Cohen.

The Real Housewives of New Jersey focuses on the lives of returning cast members Teresa Giudice, Melissa Gorga, and Dina Manzo; Manzo returned after originally leaving the series during season 2. Former cast members Jacqueline Laurita and Kathy Wakile appeared periodically throughout the season, but were replaced, as was Caroline Manzo, by Teresa Aprea, Amber Marchese, and Nicole Napolitano.

Production and crew
The Real Housewives of New Jersey was officially renewed for its sixth season on April 8, 2014, while its official trailer premiered on May 14, 2014. Rebecca Toth Diefenbach, Valerie Haselton, Lucilla D'Agostino, Jim Fraenkel, Omid Kahangi, Caroline Self, and Andy Cohen are recognized as the series' executive producers; it is produced and distributed by Sirens Media.

Cast and synopsis

Two of the five housewives featured on the fifth season of The Real Housewives of New Jersey returned for the sixth installment. Caroline Manzo, one of the series' original housewives, announced her departure shortly after the fifth season concluded in October 2013, and began filming for her spin-off series Manzo'd with Children. Jacqueline Laurita and Kathy Wakile, who respectively joined the series during the first and third seasons, confirmed their exits from the program in February and May 2014. Bravo officially announced the cast for the sixth season, which consists of six housewives, on May 14, 2014.

Teresa Giudice and her husband Joe handle the fallout of their highly publicized legal difficulties, while Melissa Gorga and her husband Joe embark on a business venture in the sanitation industry. Breast cancer survivor and new housewife Amber Marchese wishes to rekindle her former friendship with Gorga, while twins Teresa Aprea and Nicole Napolitano join as the second and third new Housewives of the season; Teresa and her husband Rino own a successful restaurant in Little Italy, Manhattan, while the single Nicole balances her professional pursuits with a budding relationship. Caroline Manzo's estranged sister Dina Manzo announced her return for the sixth season later in October 2013; she was originally included as an original Housewife during the first season, but she left during season 2. Manzo is depicted strengthening her longtime companionship with Giudice, beginning to date while continuing with her divorce, and sending her daughter Lexi to college.

Episodes

References

External links

2014 American television seasons
New Jersey (season 6)